Chris or Christopher Douglas may refer to:

Chris Douglas (born 1974), musician from San Francisco
Chris Douglas (cricketer) (born 1989), cricketer from Bermuda
Chris Douglas (football coach), American football coach
Christopher Douglas (American actor) (born 1969), American actor and host of television mini-series Feeding Frenzy on Animal Planet
Christopher Douglas (British actor), British actor and writer
Christopher Douglas (sledge hockey), see 2019 World Para Ice Hockey Championships

See also
Chris Douglas-Roberts (born 1987), American basketball player